Kirkliston railway station served the village of Kirkliston, historically in the county of West Lothian, Scotland from 1866 to 1966 on the North British Railway.

History 
The station opened on 1 March 1866 by the North British Railway. To the east was the goods yard and to the southwest was the signal box, which opened in 1894. To the south were sidings that served Kirkliston Distillery. The station closed on 22 September 1930 but it remained open for goods until 7 February 1966.

References

External links 

Disused railway stations in West Lothian
Former North British Railway stations
Railway stations in Great Britain opened in 1866
Railway stations in Great Britain closed in 1930
1866 establishments in Scotland
1966 disestablishments in Scotland